Tofor-kon Tete Rengrengmal (c.1918 – December 1999) was a Vanuatan chief.

Biography
He was the first born of one of the most influential families in North Ambrym. His family were famous for their proficiency with magic and sorcery. Tofor's father, Tainmal was the highest level chief the island ever had in its history.

As a teenager, he was recognised as one of the strongest and most powerful men in his area. As a consequence the Chief, Tainmal, recruited him as his personal bodyguard and conferred upon Tofor the status and trappings attendant with that position.

During the Second World War, Tofor fought for the Allies.  He was trained by US Army for several months and saw active service in the Solomon Islands.

Chief Tofor found himself in dispute with French and English authorities because of his alleged complicity in a number of killings. Given that all witnesses attested that Tofor had brought about these deaths by means of sorcery it proved impossible for the authorities to bring a prosecution against him due to lack of evidence

When Chief Bule Tainmal died in 1972, Tofor had reached the Meleun Getlam rank. He held the death-ceremony and paid his Mal rank the same day.

External links

Vanuatuan chiefs
1999 deaths
Year of birth uncertain